Josef Loidl (born 3 June 1946 in Ebensee) is a retired Austrian alpine skier who competed in the 1972 Winter Olympics.

References

External links
 sports-reference.com

1946 births
Living people
Austrian male alpine skiers
Olympic alpine skiers of Austria
Alpine skiers at the 1972 Winter Olympics